Cortinarius morrisii is a species of fungus in the family Cortinariaceae native to North America. It was described by Peck in 1905.

References

External links

morrisii
Fungi described in 1905
Fungi of North America